The 1973 Balkans Cup was an edition of the Balkans Cup, a football competition for representative clubs from the Balkan states. It was contested by 6 teams and Lokomotiv Sofia won the trophy.

Group A

Group B

Finals

First leg

Second leg

Lokomotiv Sofia won 3–1 on aggregate.

References

External links 

 RSSSF Archive → Balkans Cup
 
 Mehmet Çelik. "Balkan Cup". Turkish Soccer

1973
1972–73 in European football
1973–74 in European football
1972–73 in Romanian football
1973–74 in Romanian football
1972–73 in Greek football
1973–74 in Greek football
1972–73 in Bulgarian football
1973–74 in Bulgarian football
1972–73 in Turkish football
1973–74 in Turkish football
1972–73 in Yugoslav football
1973–74 in Yugoslav football
1972–73 in Albanian football
1973–74 in Albanian football